QME may refer to:
 Quartet on the Middle East
 Qualitative Military Edge
 Quake Model Editor